Areosa is a civil parish located in the municipality (concelho) of Viana do Castelo, in northern Portugal. The population in 2011 was 4,853, in an area of 14.11 km².

References

Freguesias of Viana do Castelo